Scamandra is a genus of planthoppers in the subfamily Aphaeninae (Fulgoridae): found in Malesia.

Species
The Fulgoromorpha Lists on the Web (FLOW) lists:
 Scamandra agnes Nagai & Porion, 2002
 Scamandra basigera (Walker, 1870)
 Scamandra castanea Constant, 2017
 Scamandra clytaemnestra Breddin, 1901
 Scamandra collaris Constant, 2017
 Scamandra crinita Schmidt, 1906
 Scamandra daphne (Stål, 1863)
 Scamandra detanii Nagai & Porion, 2002
 Scamandra diana Distant, 1892
 Scamandra hecuba Stål, 1863
 Scamandra hermione Stål, 1864
 Scamandra huangi Constant, 2013
 Scamandra jakli Rolcík, 2008
 Scamandra lachesis Stål, 1863
 Scamandra leilae Chew Kea Foo, Porion & Audibert, 2010
 Scamandra lumawigi Constant, 2013
 Scamandra lydia Stål, 1870
 Scamandra mangolana Constant, 2017
 Scamandra marcellae Porion, Audibert & Nagai, 2016
 Scamandra mucorea Gerstaecker, 1895
 Scamandra multimaculata Audibert & Porion, 2018
 Scamandra polychroma Gerstaecker, 1895
 Scamandra rosea (Guérin-Méneville, 1834) - type species
 Scamandra sanana Constant, 2017
 Scamandra sanguiflua (Stål, 1863)
 Scamandra selene Breddin, 1901
 Scamandra semele Stål, 1863
 Scamandra shiinae Nagai & Porion, 2004
 Scamandra silighinii Audibert & Porion, 2018
 Scamandra stanjakli Constant, 2013
 Scamandra tamborana Lallemand, 1960
 Scamandra thetis (Stål, 1863)
 Scamandra undulata Lallemand, 1959
 Scamandra vanvyvei Constant, 2013
 Scamandra voisinae Nagai & Porion, 2002

Gallery

References

External links
 
 

Hemiptera of Asia
Auchenorrhyncha genera
Aphaeninae